Francis Arthur Ormsby (born 1947) is a Northern Irish author and poet.

Life
Frank Ormsby was born in Irvinestown, County Fermanagh. He was educated at St Michael's College, Enniskillen and then Queen's University Belfast.

From 1976 until his retirement in 2010, he was Head of English at the Royal Belfast Academical Institution.

Work
Over a period of fifty years he has published ten books of poetry and has also edited another ten collections.

From 1969 to 1989 he was editor of The Honest Ulsterman.

He has also edited the Poetry Ireland Review.

Ormsby was appointed as the Ireland Professor of Poetry in 2019, to serve a three-year term at Trinity College Dublin, Queen's University Belfast and University College Dublin.

Bibliography

Poetry collections

Edited volumes

 Northern Windows: An Anthology of Ulster Autobiography, Belfast: Blackstaff Press, 1987.
 The Long Embrace: Twentieth Century Irish Love Poems, London: Faber & Faber, 1987.
 Thine in Storm and Calm: An Amanda McKittrick Ros Reader, Belfast: Blackstaff Press, 1988.
.
 The Collected Poems of John Hewitt, Belfast: Blackstaff Press, 1991.
 A Rage for Order: Poetry of the Northern Ireland Troubles, Belfast: Blackstaff Press, 1992.
 The Hip Flask: Short Poems from Ireland, Belfast: Blackstaff Press, 2001.
 The Blackbird's Nest: An Anthology of Poetry from Queen's University Belfast, Belfast: Blackstaff Press, 2006.
 The Selected Poems of John Hewitt (co-edited with Michael Longley), Belfast: Blackstaff Press, 2007.

Recordings
 the kiss of light, Frank Ormsby, Anthony Toner, Neil Martin, Linley Hamilton. Frank Ormsby reads his poems followed in each case by a musical composition inspired by the poems. Dozens of Cousins CD.

List of poems

Prizes and awards
 2002 - Lawrence O’Shaughnessy Award for Poetry, University of Saint Thomas, St. Paul, Minnesota
 1992 - Cultural Traditions Award, given in memory of John Hewitt,

References

External links
 "Some Older American Poets by Frank Ormsby", theguardian.com, 17 October 2009.
 Carol Rumens, "Poem of the week: Fireflies by Frank Ormsby", The Guardian, 19 December 2011.
 Frank Ormsby's Bog Cotton, NewYorker.com, 4 March 2013.
 Frank Ormsby's Parkinsons, BBC Radio 4, 26 November 2017.
Stuart A. Rose Manuscript, Archives, and Rare Book Library, Emory University: Frank Ormsby papers, circa 1967-2012

See also

List of Northern Irish writers

1947 births
20th-century Irish people
Living people
People educated at St Michael's College, Enniskillen
People from Irvinestown
Male poets from Northern Ireland
The New Yorker people
Date of birth missing (living people)
Male writers from Northern Ireland
21st-century writers from Northern Ireland